The 2020–21 FIS Cross-Country World Cup was the 40th official World Cup season in cross-country skiing for men and women.

The season began with the Nordic Opening stage event on 27–29 November 2020 in Ruka, Finland and was planned to conclude with the World Cup Finals on 19–21 March 2021 in Beijing, China. However, due to the COVID-19 pandemic, FIS announced on 4 December 2020 that all events in China, including the Cross-Country World Cup final were cancelled. World Cup Finals were moved to Lillehammer, where December competitions couldn't be arranged. However, on 12 February 2021, all the events scheduled in Oslo and Lillehammer were cancelled due to ongoing pandemic. The World Cup Final stage event was called off this year and the season ended on 13–14 March in Engadin, Switzerland, where the final pursuit races made a replacement for cancelled 30/50 kilometers annual competition in Oslo.
The pandemic also reduced participation, after the opening in Ruka the Norwegian, Swedish and Finnish teams announced that they would not compete in Davos and Dresden as they felt that they could not guarantee a safe environment. Later, Norway announced they would also not participate in Tour de Ski.

Calendar

Men

Women

Men's standings

Overall

Distance

Sprint

Prize money

U23

Bonus Ranking

Women's standings

Overall

Distance

Sprint

Prize money

U23

Bonus Ranking

Nations Cup

Overall

Men

Women

Points distribution 
The table shows the number of points won in the 2020/21 Cross-Country Skiing World Cup for men and women. Team Sprint and Relay used to count only for Nations Cup but from this season they were also included in individual standings.

Achievements 

Only individual events.

First World Cup career victory

Men
  Erik Valnes, 24, in his 4th season – the WC 1 (Sprint C) in Ruka; first podium was 2018–19 WC 8 (Sprint F) in Dresden
  Oskar Svensson, 25, in his 8th season – the WC 5 (Sprint C) in Val di Fiemme; also first podium
  Denis Spitsov, 24, in his 4th season – the WC 5 (10 km Mass Start F) in Val di Fiemme; first podium was 2017–18 WC 8 (9 km Pursuit F) in Val di Fiemme

Women
  Rosie Brennan, 31, in her 10th season – the WC 2 (Sprint F) in Davos; first podium was 2020–21 WC 1 (10 km Pursuit F) in Ruka
    Nadine Fähndrich, 25, in her 6th season – the WC 4 (Sprint F) in Dresden; first podium was 2018–19 WC 14 (10 km C) in Cogne
  Ebba Andersson, 23, in her 5th season – the WC 5 (10 km Mass Start F) in Val di Fiemme; first podium was 2018–19 WC 2 (10 km C) in Ruka
  Maja Dahlqvist, 26, in her 7th season – the WC 10 (Sprint F) in Ulricehamn; first podium was 2017–18 WC 9 (Sprint F) in Dresden

First World Cup podium

Men
  Aleksey Chervotkin, 25, in his 7th season – no. 2 in the WC 1 (15 km C) in Ruka
  Artem Maltsev, 27, in his 5th season – no. 3 in the WC 3 (15 km F) in Davos
  Oskar Svensson, 25, in his 8th season – no. 1 in the WC 5 (Sprint C) in Val di Fiemme
  Jens Burman, 26, in his 7th season – no. 3 in the WC 12 (50 km Pursuit F) in Engadin

Women
  Helene Marie Fossesholm, 19, in her 2nd season – no. 2 in the WC 1 (10 km Pursuit F) in Ruka
  Rosie Brennan, 31, in her 10th season – no. 3 in the WC 1 (10 km Pursuit F) in Ruka
  Tatiana Sorina, 26, in her 4th season – no. 2 in the WC 1 (11th Nordic Opening Overall) in Ruka
  Hailey Swirbul, 22, in her 3rd season – no. 3 in the WC 3 (10 km F) in Davos
  Emma Ribom, 23, in her 3rd season – no. 3 in the WC 5 (Sprint C) in Val di Fiemme
  Delphine Claudel, 24, in her 5th season – no. 3 in the WC 5 (10 km Mass Start F) in Val di Fiemme

Victories in this World Cup (all-time number of victories in parentheses)

Men
  Alexander Bolshunov, 10 (27) first places
  Johannes Høsflot Klæbo, 3 (40) first places
  Federico Pellegrino, 3 (16) first places
  Oskar Svensson, 2 (2) first places
  Emil Iversen, 1 (8) first place
  Simen Hegstad Krüger, 1 (4) first place
  Hans Christer Holund, 1 (2) first place
  Erik Valnes, 1 (1) first place
  Denis Spitsov, 1 (1) first place

Women
  Linn Svahn, 6 (9) first places
  Therese Johaug, 4 (77) first places
  Jessie Diggins, 4 (10) first places
  Yuliya Stupak, 2 (3) first places
  Rosie Brennan, 2 (2) first places
  Heidi Weng, 1 (12) first place
  Natalya Nepryayeva, 1 (3) first place
    Nadine Fähndrich, 1 (1) first place
  Ebba Andersson, 1 (1) first place
  Maja Dahlqvist, 1 (1) first place

Retirements

Men
  Livio Bieler
  Niklas Dyrhaug
  Sebastian Eisenlauer
 Simeon Hamilton
  Martin Johnsrud Sundby
  Viktor Thorn
  Stefan Zelger

Women
 Sadie Maubet Bjornsen
  Mari Eide
  Anouk Faivre-Picon
  Hanna Falk
 Sophie Caldwell Hamilton
  Laura Mononen
  Susanna Saapunki
  Anna Zherebyateva

References 

 
FIS Cross-Country World Cup seasons
World Cup
World Cup